Materuni Waterfall is one of the Waterfalls in the Mware River (Kilimanjaro Region, North East Tanzania). It is found in the village of Materuni on the edge of the Kilimanjaro mountain reserve.

References

Lists of waterfalls
Geography of Tanzania